The 1922–23 Hong Kong First Division League season was the 15th since its establishment.

Overview
King's Own Rifiles won the title.

References
RSSSF

Hong Kong First Division League
1922 in Hong Kong
1923 in Hong Kong
Hong Kong First Division League seasons
Hong Kong
Hong Kong